Sarre (Issime ) is a town and comune in the Aosta Valley region of north-western Italy.

Twin towns — sister cities
Sarre is twinned with:

  La Turbie, France

References 

Cities and towns in Aosta Valley